Puka Qaqa (Quechua puka red, qaqa rock, "red rock", also spelled Puca Khakha) is a  mountain in the Bolivian Andes. It is located in the Chuquisaca Department, Jaime Zudáñez Province, Icla Municipality, northeast of the village of Icla. The Jatun Mayu flows along its southern slope.

References 

Mountains of Chuquisaca Department